Steven Yawson (born 31 August 1999) is an English professional footballer who plays as a forward for West Lancs League side Milnthorpe Corinthians.

Career
Yawson came through the Morecambe Academy, and joined Kendal Town of the Northern Premier League Division One North on work experience on 24 January 2017. He scored a hat-trick on his debut four days later in a 5–0 win over Droylsden at Parkside Road. His loan further proved to be successful as he scored five goals in his first five games for the "Mintcakes", before manager David Foster extended his loan spell until the end of the 2016–17 season. He returned to Morecambe to make his first-team debut on 29 April 2017, coming on as a 77th-minute substitute for Paul Mullin in a 1–1 draw with Wycombe Wanderers at the Globe Arena. Yawson was loaned out to Kendal Town once again on 26 February 2018 for one month.

He was released by Morecambe at the end of the 2017–18 season. Which led to Yawson signing for Kendal Town on 22 August 2018. On 28 March 2019, Yawson signed for Prescot Cables who claim he is "a 19-year-old who is comfortable on the flanks and will add additional pace to the squad" He signed for West Lancs side Milnthorpe Corinthians in 2019–20 season and won the Westmorland  County cup in his 1st season.

Career statistics

References

1999 births
Living people
Black British sportsmen
English footballers
Association football forwards
Morecambe F.C. players
Kendal Town F.C. players
Northern Premier League players
English Football League players
English people of Ghanaian descent
Ghanaian footballers
Ghanaian expatriate footballers
Prescot Cables F.C. players